Joline Godfrey is the founder and Chief Creative Officer for The Unexpected Table, a virtual gathering place for exploring issues of thriving families amidst accelerating change. Godfrey is the author of Raising Financially Fit Kids.

Career
Godfrey began her career as a clinical social worker. Godfrey became an executive of the Polaroid Corporation, where she provided in-house family and therapeutic services to officers and employees. , she launched Odysseum, a spin-off from Polaroid, and sold it in 1990, as described in a Harvard Business School case study. Odysseum was a creativity training company serving other Fortune 500 firms.

In 1992, an article she wrote for Inc. Magazine led her to launch An Income of Her Own, the first non-profit offering financial education for girls. Joline later founded Independent Means in 1996.

Based in Santa Barbara, CA, IMI provides financial education for children and families with a range of programs, products and services, including The Great Families Program for thought leader families; Camp $tart-Up, DollarDiva and Indie Girls programming; Fashion and Finance; Sports and Money; etc. Independent Means' clients include Fortune 100 families, leading financial institutions, multi-family offices and boutique investment firms.

Works
Godfrey is the author of Raising Financially Fit Kids, Our Wildest Dreams: Women Making Money, Having Fun, Doing Good; No More Frogs To Kiss: 99 Ways to Give Economic Power to Girls; and Twenty $ecrets to Money and Independence: The DollarDiva’s Guide to Life.

Awards and honors

Godfrey is a graduate of the University of Maine and Boston University (where she received an MSW) and was awarded an Honorary Degree in Business from Bentley College in 1995. She was a Kellogg Leadership Fellow and the recipient of the Leavey Award for Excellence, as well as the Beta Gamma Sigma Entrepreneurship Award. Recognized in features for The Today Show, Oprah, Fortune, Business Week, The New York Times, and more. Ms. Godfrey is a frequent speaker and consultant worldwide.

References

 Independent Means Inc.
 Sullivan, Paul (May 28, 2010). "Teaching Work Values to Children of Wealth" The New York Times. The New York Times Company. Retrieved June 15, 2010.
 Joline Godfrey and the Polaroid Corp Harvard Business School Case Study

External links
 Joline's blog

WorldCat Identities
VIAF: 94058123
SUDOC: 163574553

American women chief executives
University of Maine alumni
Boston University School of Social Work alumni
1950 births
Living people
21st-century American women